Nana Kheda Bus Stand or Pandit Deendayal Upadhyay Bus Stand is a bus terminus in Ujjain, Madhya Pradesh. Nana Kheda is a bus terminus that provides bus service to destinations located in other states. Nana Kheda is the largest Bus stand in Madhya Pradesh. Nana Kheda may also provide bus services to destinations in the same state.

Bus Stand was built in 1992 just before Simhastha. Bus Stand is spread over 12.5 acres of land with coast of 150 crores.  Buses are available for Jaipur, Ajmer, Indore, Bhopal, Pune, Gujarat, Maharashtra, Rajasthan and various other locations.

References 

Bus stations in Madhya Pradesh
Transport in Ujjain
Parking facilities in India
Memorials to Deendayal Upadhyay
1992 establishments in Madhya Pradesh